Peril is a book by American journalists Bob Woodward and Robert Costa about the last days of Donald Trump's presidency, as well as the presidential transition and early presidency of Joe Biden. The book was published on September 21, 2021, by Simon & Schuster.

Considered the culmination of Woodward's reporting on the Trump Administration, Peril takes its title from an excerpt of Biden's inaugural address. In the speech, Biden proclaimed that Americans "will press forward with speed and urgency, for we have much to do in this winter of peril and possibility." This contrasts with Woodward's previous books about the Trump administration, Fear and Rage, which took their titles from Trump's comments made during a March 2016 interview conducted by Woodward.

Background 
Following the publication of Woodward's previous two Trump books, Fear and Rage, Peril acts as the final installment in Bob Woodward's Donald Trump trilogy. The book follows Trump's second Presidential campaign while interspersing details from Joe Biden's campaign. Peril has two narratives: one following Trump, and the other following the campaign of Joe Biden as he defeats his primary opponent Bernie Sanders and later faces Trump himself. The majority of the book was written as an exposé during the final months of Trump's presidency, detailing his legal challenges to the 2020 presidential election, his attempts to subvert the certification system, and his insistence that the election was stolen.

Content 
The conversation between Mark Milley and Chinese general Li Zuocheng is one of the subjects of Peril. The book also reveals further new details behind attempts to overturn the 2020 United States presidential election by the outgoing Trump administration.

Reception 
Peril received mixed reviews from critics. Chris Megerian of The Los Angeles Times panned it as a "tedious" read, criticizing Woodward and Costa for "spending more time stacking up anecdotes like bricks than generating new insights into a presidency that has already received exhaustive coverage."

Slates Fred Kaplan wrote that Peril lacks narrative structure: "Like many of Woodward's past works, this is less a cohesive book than a string of anecdotes, some hair-raising, some less so than they appear to be. Perhaps because it was churned out so quickly, this book contains some very intriguing bits—the hints of a story, but not quite the follow-through—that someone should investigate more thoroughly."

In his New York Times review, John Williams wrote, "Like an installment of a deathless Marvel franchise, for all its spectacle 'Peril' ends with a dismaying sense of prologue."

In a positive appraisal of the book, Kirkus Reviews called Peril "[a] solid work of investigation that, while treading well-covered ground, offers plenty of surprises."

References 

2021 non-fiction books
American political books
Collaborative non-fiction books
Non-fiction books about elections
Books about Donald Trump
Books about the Trump administration
Donald Trump 2020 presidential campaign
Criticism of Donald Trump
Books about Joe Biden
Joe Biden 2020 presidential campaign
Books by Bob Woodward
Simon & Schuster books
English-language books